Maksim Vasilyev may refer to:
 Maksim Vasilyev (footballer, born 1999), Russian footballer
 Maksim Vasilyev (footballer, born 1987) , Russian footballer with FC Yenisey Krasnoyarsk
 Maksim Yuryevich Vasilyev (born 1974), Russian football manager and player